The 2017 East–West Shrine Game was the 92nd staging of the all–star college football exhibition to benefit Shriners Hospital for Children. The game was held at Tropicana Field in St. Petersburg, Florida, on January 21, 2017, with a 3:00 PM EST kickoff. It was one of the final 2016–17 bowl games concluding the 2016 FBS football season. The game featured NCAA players (predominantly from the Football Bowl Subdivision) and a few select invitees from Canadian university football, rostered into "East" and "West" teams.

The game featured more than 100 players from the 2016 NCAA Division I FBS football season and prospects for the 2017 draft of the professional National Football League (NFL). In the week prior to the game, scouts from all 32 NFL teams attended.

This was first East–West Shrine Game with coaches and game officials supplied by the NFL. Head coaches in the game were assistant coaches with NFL teams who did not advance to the postseason; Brentson Buckner of the Arizona Cardinals and George Edwards of the Minnesota Vikings. The game was broadcast on the NFL Network.

Players

Full roster is available here.

East team

Offense

Defense

Specialists

West team

Offense

Defense

Specialists

Game summary

Scoring summary

Statistics

See also
2017 NFL draft

References

East West Shrine Game
East–West Shrine Bowl
American football in Florida
Sports competitions in St. Petersburg, Florida
East-West Shrine Game
East-West Shrine Game